Giordano Riccati or Jordan Riccati (25 February 1709 – 20 July 1790) was the first experimental mechanician to study material elastic moduli as we understand them today.  His 1782 paper on determining the relative Young's moduli of steel and brass using flexural vibrations preceded Thomas Young's 1807 paper on the subject of moduli.  The ratio that Riccati found was

Even though the experiments were performed more than 200 years ago, this value is remarkably close to accepted values found in engineering handbooks in 2007.

Giordano Riccati was the son of the theoretical mechanician Jacopo Riccati and brother of Jesuit mathematician and physicist Vincenzo Riccati.

References

Works

External links 
 

18th-century Italian people